Cock o' the North may refer to:

People
 Cock o' the North, the traditional epithet attached to the chief of the Clan Gordon
 Alexander Gordon, 4th Duke of Gordon (1743–1827), known as Cock o' the North

Transportation
 Cock o' the North, a LNER P2 class railway locomotive
 Cock o' the North, a LNER Thompson Class A2/2 railway locomotive

Other uses
 Cock o' the North (liqueur), a whisky-based alcoholic liqueur
 Cock o' the North (greyhounds), a UK greyhound race
 Cock o' the North (golf), a golf tournament formerly held in Zambia
 Cock o' the North (music), a traditional Scottish bagpipe tune
 Brambling (Fringilla montifringilla), a bird, also known as cock o' the north